Francesco Minerva (31 January 1904 – 23 August 2004) was an Italian Roman Catholic prelate; at his death he was the second-oldest living bishop in the Roman Catholic Church, after Corrado Bafile. He was also one of its longest-serving priests, having been ordained on 16 April 1927.

Biography
Minerva was born at Canosa di Puglia. He graduated in theology at the Pontifical Lateran University and, later, in law at the University of Bari.
Pope Pius XII named  Minerva bishop of Nardò in 1948, and in 1950 transferred him to the somewhat larger diocese of Lecce. While his successor in Nardò, Corrado Ursi, went on to become Archbishop of Naples and a Cardinal, Minerva continued in Lecce, which was elevated to an archdiocese in 1980, and retired in 1981.

He died at Canosa di Puglia in 2004. He is buried in the Cathedral of San Sabino in that city.

Notes and references

1904 births
2004 deaths
People from Canosa di Puglia
Bishops in Apulia
Participants in the Second Vatican Council
20th-century Italian Roman Catholic bishops
Italian centenarians
Men centenarians